Rothschildia jacobaeae is a moth of the family Saturniidae first described by Francis Walker in 1855. It is endemic to Argentina and Brazil.

The wingspan is 80–100 mm.

The larvae feed on plants of several families, including species of Ilex paraguariensis, Jacaranda caroba, Jacaranda mimosifolia,  Ligustrum spp., Ligustrum ovalifolium, Cephalanthus glabratus.

References

External links
"Rothschildia jacobaeae (Walker, 1855)". Mundo Butterfly. Archived from the original February 26, 2012.

Jacobaeae
Endemic fauna of Argentina
Moths of South America
Moths described in 1855